Naked and Afraid is an American reality series that airs on the Discovery Channel. Each episode chronicles the lives of two survivalists (1 woman; 1 man) who meet for the first time and are given the task of surviving a stay in the wilderness naked for 21 days. After they meet in the assigned locale, the partners must find and/or produce potable water, food, shelter, and clothing within the environment.

Series overview

Episodes

Season 1 (2013)

Season 2 (2014)

Season 3 (2014)

Season 4 (2015)

Season 5 (2015)

Season 6 (2016) 

Note that in addition to the above, there are also a number of unlisted Pop-Up Editions (which have different titles from their original episodes), and specials, such as "Franco and Rogen", featuring James Franco and Seth Rogen.

Season 7 (2017)

Season 8 (2017)

Season 9 (2018)

Season 10 (2019)

Season 11 (2019–20)

Season 12 (2021)

Season 13 (2021)

Season 14 (2022)

Season 15 (2023)

References

Lists of American non-fiction television series episodes
Lists of reality television series episodes